The University of Montenegro Biotechnical Faculty (Montenegrin: Biotehnički fakultet Univerziteta Crne Gore Биотехнички факултет Универзитета Црне Горе) is one of the educational institutions of the University of Montenegro. The building is located in Podgorica, at the University campus.

History 

Scientific research in agriculture in Montenegro was established in 1937, when the Ministry of Agriculture of the Kingdom of Yugoslavia decided to establish the experimental State Research Station for Southern Cultures in Bar. After World War II, the founding of new institutions and renewal of previously existing ones followed, such as: 
 the Institute for Agricultural Research in Podgorica (1945)
 the Institute for Animal Husbandry (Livestock) in Nikšić
 the Institute for Southern Cultures and Viticulture in Bar (1947)
 Soil Testing Units in Bar (1949)
 Veterinary Diagnostic Units in Titograd (1950) and 
 the Centre for Fruit Growing in Bijelo Polje (1952).

The Agricultural Institute was established in 1961, as a result of merging the above-mentioned institutions. It functioned under that name until 1997, when it was transformed into the Biotechnical Institute by including the Forestry Sector into one unique scientific research institution. By establishing the Studies of Agriculture, in 2005, the Institute developed into a faculty, and in 2008 formally changed its name into the Biotechnical Faculty.

Organization 

The Faculty of Biotechnology has adequately equipped classrooms and laboratories situated in the Faculty's buildings in Podgorica, Bar and Bijelo Polje, as well as experimental plots for a part of students’ professional practice and organization of Faculty production.

Undergraduate academic studies 

The undergraduate academic studies are divided in two study groups:
 Plant production
 Undergraduate applied studies of Continental fruit growing in Bijelo Polje
 Undergraduate applied studies of Mediterranean fruit growing in Bar
 Cattle breeding

Specialist academic studies 

The specialist academic studies at the Faculty have four study groups:
 Fruit and wine growing
 Cultivation of soil and vegetable growing
 Plant protection
 Cattle breeding

Master studies 

The master studies of Plant production are organized on the following three groups:
 Fruit and wine growing
 Cultivation of soil and vegetable growing
 Plant protection

References 

Montenegro
Biotechnology
Biotechnology
Biotechnology
Biotechnology
Montenegro
1961 establishments in Yugoslavia
Organizations established in 1961